Guillermo Escalada Píriz (born 24 April 1936) is a Uruguayan former footballer who played as a forward.

Career
Escalada began playing club football with Club Nacional de Football, where he would win league titles in 1956, 1957 and 1958. He also played for Gimnasia de La Plata and Montevideo Wanderers.

Escalada scored eleven goals in 30 appearances for the Uruguay national football team.

Career statistics

International

References

External links
 

1936 births
Living people
Uruguayan footballers
Uruguay international footballers
1962 FIFA World Cup players
Association football forwards
Uruguayan Primera División players
Club Nacional de Football players
Montevideo Wanderers F.C. players
Club de Gimnasia y Esgrima La Plata footballers
Copa América-winning players